William E. "Bill" Conway Jr. (born August 27, 1949) is an American billionaire businessman, investor and philanthropist. Conway serves as Co-Executive Chairman of the Board, Founder of the Carlyle Group. He also serves as Chairman of the Board of Trustees of Johns Hopkins Medicine and is a member of the Board of Trustees of the Catholic University of America. According to Forbes, Conway had a net worth of US$3.6 billion as of April 2022.

Early life and education
Conway attended Dartmouth College, where he earned a bachelor's degree in Science in 1971. Continuing his studies at the University of Chicago Booth School of Business, he received his MBA degree in 1974 with his main focus being on Finance. Conway went to night school for his MBA while working at the First National Bank of Chicago.

Career
He started his career by serving in a variety of positions in corporate finance, commercial lending, workout loans and general management for almost ten years with First National Bank of Chicago. From 1981 to 1986, Conway had worked in various financial positions at MCI Communications being named senior vice president and chief financial officer in 1984. In 1987, Conway founded The Carlyle Group with David Rubenstein and Daniel A. D'Aniello. The firm has grown into a global investment firm with $293 billion of assets under management, with more than 1,800 employees in 31 offices on six continents.

He has served as the chairman of the boards of Nextel Communications and United Defense Industries. He has made charitable donations to the Catholic Church. As of April 2022, he is the 809th richest person in the world and is worth of $3.6 billion.

Conway is scheduled to speak at the November 2022 Global Financial Leaders' Investment Summit, with the Hong Kong Democracy Council claiming that his presence, along with other financial executives, legitimizes the Hong Kong government's whitewashing of the erosion of freedoms in the city. Several members of Congress also warned that US financial executives should not attend the Summit, saying "Their presence only serves to legitimise the swift dismantling of Hong Kong's autonomy, free press and the rule of law by Hong Kong authorities acting along with the Chinese Communist Party."

Political activities 
Conway's son, also named Bill Conway, ran in the 2020 Democratic primary election for Cook County State's Attorney against incumbent Kim Foxx. Conway donated $10.5 million of his personal fortune to his son's ultimately unsuccessful campaign.

Personal life
In 1999, Conway bought Merrywood, the childhood home of Jackie Kennedy, from Alan I. Kay for $15.5 million. Less than a year later, however, he sold it to Steve Case, the former CEO of AOL and his wife, Jean Villanueva, for $24.5 million. Conway was previously married and divorced. He has one child from his prior marriage, Bill Conway. He is currently married. Today, he and his wife Joanne live in McLean, Virginia.

The nursing school of the Catholic University of America, the Conway School of Nursing, is named after him and his wife.

Philanthropy 
Conway and his wife Joanne support a number of charities and institutions.  In June 2019 they donated $20 million to the Catholic University of America to create the Conway School of Nursing. Since 2012, Conway pledged over $55 million for the Latin American Youth Center to finance the organization's educational programs. Other significant donations of Conway and his wife Joanne include Villanova University’s M. Louise Fitzpatrick College of Nursing, the University of Virginia’s School of Nursing Trinity Washington University and more.

Publications
Why We're Investing in America, The Wall Street Journal (November 19, 2012)

References

1949 births
Living people
20th-century American businesspeople
21st-century American businesspeople
American billionaires
American chief executives of financial services companies
American chief financial officers
American financiers
American investors
Businesspeople from Massachusetts
Businesspeople from Virginia
The Carlyle Group people
Catholics from Virginia
Dartmouth College alumni
People from Lowell, Massachusetts
People from McLean, Virginia
Private equity and venture capital investors
University of Chicago Booth School of Business alumni